John William Robertson (15 July 1892 – 8 September 1982) was an Australian rules football player for . His career was cut short due to World War I and the injuries obtained in the conflict.

Family
Born in Semaphore South, South Australia.

Football
Robertson made his South Australian National Football League (SANFL) senior debut for Port Adelaide Football Club in 1912. He quickly became a leading player in South Australia and was chosen for the South Australian squad for the 1914 National Carnival, held in Sydney.

The best player from each state in the carnival was awarded a gold medal  known as the Referee Medal (after the sporting newspaper The Referee  and Robertson was awarded the South Australian gold medal.

See also
 1916 Pioneer Exhibition Game

Notes

References
 Studio portrait at Studio portrait of members of 31st Battery, 8th Field Artillery Brigade (P11373.001), collection of the Australian War Memorial.
 First World War Embarkation Roll, Gunner John William Robertson (20007), collection of the Australian War Memorial.
 First World War Nominal Roll, Sergeant John William Robertson (20007), collection of the Australian War Memorial.
 First World War Service Record, Sergeant John William Robertson (20007), National Archives of Australia.

External links
 

1892 births
1982 deaths
Port Adelaide Football Club (SANFL) players
Port Adelaide Football Club players (all competitions)
Australian rules footballers from South Australia